Faisal Abdulaziz Al Dosari (8 January 1968 – 19 February 2021) was a Bahraini football defender who played for Bahrain in the 2004 AFC Asian Cup.

References 

2021 deaths
Bahraini footballers
Bahrain international footballers
Association football defenders
1968 births
Footballers at the 2002 Asian Games
Asian Games competitors for Bahrain
Place of death missing
2004 AFC Asian Cup players
Al-Muharraq SC players